Shaw Tower, located at 1067 W. Cordova St in Downtown Vancouver's Coal Harbour, in British Columbia, Canada, is home to Shaw Communications' headquarters for Lower Mainland Operations and credited to local architect James K. M. Cheng.

The building stands at 489 feet (149 m) or 41 stories and was completed in 2004. It is currently the seventh-tallest building in Vancouver. The lower 16 floors of the tower are offices while the upper 24 floors contain 130 work-live condominiums. Shaw Communications, the building's namesake, occupies 11 full floors. The building has two official addresses: 1067 is the building's business address, while 1077 is the residential address.

See also
 List of tallest buildings in Vancouver
 Deadpool 2 and Joi "SJ" Harris, an accident during filming of Deadpool 2 concerning Joi "SJ" Harris occurred at Shaw Tower.

References

External links
 Shaw Tower on Emporis
 Shaw Communications official site

Shaw Communications
Skyscrapers in Vancouver
Buildings and structures completed in 2004
James K. M. Cheng buildings
Skyscraper office buildings in Canada
Residential skyscrapers in Canada